The 15th Indian Infantry Brigade was an infantry brigade formation of the Indian Army during World War II. It was formed in September 1940, at Secunderabad in India and assigned to the 9th Indian Infantry Division. Between February and March 1941, it was attached to the 10th Indian Infantry Division, before returning to the 9th in March 1941 and sailing for Malaya. Once in Malaya the brigade was assigned to the 11th Indian Infantry Division. During the Malayan Campaign after the Battle of Jitra and the Battle of Kampar it absorbed the remnants of the 6th Indian Infantry Brigade in December 1941. The brigade eventually surrendered with the rest of the III Indian Corps after the Battle of Singapore 15 February 1942.

Formation
1st Battalion, 14th Punjab Regiment September 1940 to January 1942
2nd Battalion, 9th Jat Regiment	September 1940 to December 1941
3rd Battalion, 16th Punjab Regiment September 1940 to June 1941 and  December 1941 to January 1942
1st Battalion, Leicestershire Regiment February to December 1941
British Battalion December 1941 to February 1942 (composite battalion from remnants of destroyed British units)
2nd Battalion, 16th Punjab Regiment December 1941 to January 1942
5th Battalion, 14th Punjab Regiment December 1941 to January 1942
The Punjab/Jat Battalion December 1941 to February 1942 (composite battalion from remnants of destroyed Indian units)
5th Battalion, 14th Punjab Regiment January to February 1942
1st Battalion, 8th Punjab Regiment February 1942

See also

 List of Indian Army Brigades in World War II

References

British Indian Army brigades
Br